Rachel Arié (October 25, 1924 – December 12, 2018) was a French historian who focuses on Islamic Spain, in particular the period of the Nasrid Emirate of Granada. By 1992, she was director of research at the French National Center for Scientific Research and doctor honoris causa at the University of Granada.

References

Bibliography

1924 births
2018 deaths
French National Centre for Scientific Research scientists
20th-century French historians
French women historians
20th-century French women writers
21st-century French historians
21st-century French women writers
Historians of Spain
Institut national des langues et civilisations orientales alumni